The 2007–08 season was the 108th season of competitive association football and 57th season in the Football League played by Shrewsbury Town Football Club, a professional football club based in Shrewsbury, Shropshire, England. Their seventh-place finish in 2006–07 and loss to Bristol Rovers in the 2007 Football League Two play-off Final meant it was their fourth successive season in League Two. During the summer of 2007 the club moved home stadium from Gay Meadow, where they had played since 1910, to New Meadow (also known as Oteley Road Stadium). The season began on 1 July 2007 and concluded on 30 June 2008.

Manager Gary Peters signed two players before the close of the summer transfer window. Having stood 11th in the league table on 19 January, Shrewsbury were on a seven-match run without a win when Peters left the club by mutual consent in March 2008. He was replaced by Paul Simpson, who led Shrewsbury to safety from relegation despite only achieving one win in his twelve matches. The team finished the season 18th in the table. They lost in their opening round matches in both the 2007–08 FA Cup and the Football League Trophy, and were eliminated in the second round of the Football League Cup.

34 players made at least one appearance in nationally organised first-team competition, and there were 19 different goalscorers. Defender Ben Herd appeared in 48 of the 50 first-team matches over the season, the most by any player. Defender Marc Tierney made the most starts with 46, he came on in one game as a substitution making him the player with the second most appearances overall. David Hibbert finished as leading scorer with 12 goals, all of which came in league competition. Hibbert also received the most yellow cards, being booked in nine matches. Colin Murdock was the only player to be sent off in a match, receiving a red card away at Grimsby Town in the league.

Background and pre-season

The 2006–07 season was Gary Peters' third season as manager of Shrewsbury Town, following his appointment in November 2004. Shrewsbury reached the play-offs with a seventh-place finish in the 2006–07 League Two table. They beat Milton Keynes Dons 2–1 on aggregate with all goals coming in the second leg away at the National Hockey Stadium in Milton Keynes. Shrewsbury were beaten 3–1 in the 2007 Football League Two play-off Final at Wembley Stadium and remained in League Two.

Shrewsbury Town left their home stadium Gay Meadow after 97 years at the end of the 2006–07 season. There were various reasons the club decided to move stadium, most notably due to the close proximity to the River Severn making it prone to flooding. A new stadium with a capacity of 10,000 spectators was built as a replacement for Gay Meadow, it was known during the building phase and the club's first season there as both New Meadow and Oteley Road Stadium, with the former being the final name (excluding names used for sponsorship purposes). The first match at the new stadium was played on the 14 July 2007 against A-Line All Stars, a goal each from David Hibbert, Danny Hall, Tom Moss and trialist Kieran Donnolly gave Shrewsbury a 4–0 win.

Ahead of 2007–08, Shrewsbury released Sagi Burton. Four players left the club: Richard Hope to Wrexham, David Edwards to Luton Town, Ross Draper to Stafford Rangers and Steven Hogg to Gretna. Shrewsbury made two permanent summer signings, those being defender Colin Murdock from Rotherham United, and striker Fola Onibuje from Wycombe Wanderers. Striker Stuart Nicholson was brought it on a scheduled season-long loan from West Bromwich Albion.

Summary and aftermath
For the first six games Shrewsbury occupied a top seven place, enough for either automatic promotion or qualification in the League Two play-offs. From match seven Shrewsbury were in lower midtable for the rest of the season. Though never dropping as low as 23rd or 24th, the club went on a run of one win in 20 matches which brought them into the relegation battle, but a 3–0 win against Wrexham was enough for Shrewsbury to survive. The club finished in 18th place in the league table. Ben Herd made the most appearances for the club playing in 48 of the 50 first-team matches. David Hibbert was top scorer with 12 goals, all of them scored in League Two, and was the only player to reach double figures.

Ahead of the new season, Shrewsbury released Chris Mackenzie, Andy Cooke and Tom Moss. Colin Murdock, Luke Jones and Darran Kempson left to sign for Accrington Stanley, Kidderminster Harriers and Wrexham respectively. The club signed forward Grant Holt from Nottingham Forest, and defenders Mike Jackson from Blackpool, Shane Cansdell-Sherriff from Tranmere Rovers, and Graham Coughlan from Rotherham United. Brought in on loan were forward Richard Walker from Bristol Rovers, and goalkeeper Luke Daniels from West Bromwich Albion. The Shrewsbury Town F.C. Player of the Year award was established where the club's supporters voted for who they believed was the best player for Shrewsbury during the season, the award was first presented at the end of the 2008–09 season.

Match details

League Two

League table (part)

Results summary

FA Cup

League Cup

League Trophy

Transfers

In

Out

Loans in

Squad
Source:
Numbers in parentheses denote appearances as substitute.
Players with squad numbers struck through and marked  left the club during the playing season.
Players with names in italics and marked * were on loan from another club for the whole of their season with Shrewsbury Town.
Key to positions: GK – Goalkeeper; DF – Defender; MF – Midfielder; FW – Forward

See also
List of Shrewsbury Town F.C. seasons

References

Shrewsbury Town F.C. seasons
Shrewsbury Town